Ranga Reddy district ( R. R. district) is a district in the Indian state of Telangana. The district headquarters is located at Lakdikapool, Hyderabad. The district was named after the former deputy chief minister of the United Andhra Pradesh, K. V. Ranga Reddy. The district shares boundaries with Nalgonda, Yadadri Bhuvanagiri, Hyderabad, Medchal–Malkajgiri, Nagarkurnool, Mahabubnagar, Sangareddy and Vikarabad districts.

History 
The district was formed in 1978 when it was split from Hyderabad district. Originally named Hyderabad Rural district, it was renamed after Konda Venkata Ranga Reddy, a freedom fighter who fought for the independence of Telangana from the Nizams and who went on to become the deputy chief minister of Andhra Pradesh. In 2016, it was carved out during the district's reorganisation to create the new Vikarabad district and Medchal–Malkajgiri district.

Geography 

A freshwater reservoir, called Osman Sagar, Himayath Sagar, on the river Musi at Gandipet, is the prime drinking water source for the capital city of Hyderabad/Secunderabad.

Demographics 
According to the 2011 census, Ranga Reddy District has a population of 2,446,265, of which 1,254,184 were males and 1,192,081 were females. The Sex Ratio (Females per 1000 Males) was 950. The rural population in the district was 1,026,113 (41.95%) while the urban population was 1420152 (58.05%). The literacy rate was calculated to be 71.95%, higher than the state's literacy rate of 66.54%.

Economy 
 Medium-scale industries and Cement Corporation Of India (CCI)'s cement factories are established at Tandur.
 Another major company is Hyderabad Chemicals and Fertilizers, established at Moula-Ali in 1942.

In 2006 the Indian government named Ranga Reddy one of the country's 250 most backward districts (out of a total of 640). It is one of the 33 districts in Telangana currently receiving funds from the Backward Regions Grant Fund Programme (BRGF).

Administrative divisions 
The district will have five revenue divisions: Chevella, Ibrahimpatnam, Rajendranagar, Kandukur and Shadnagar. They are sub-divided into 27 mandals. Amoy Kumar IAS is the present collector of the district.

Municipalities/Municipal Corporations 
There are 12 Municipalities and 3 municipal corporations in Ranga Reddy district. They are Adibatla, Amangal, Badangpet, Bandlaguda Jagir, Ibrahimpatnam, Jalpally, Manikonda, Meerpet, Narsingi, Pedda Amberpet, Shadnagar, Shamshabad, Shankarpally, Thukkuguda, Thurkayamjal.

Mandals 

The table below categorizes mandals into their respective revenue divisions in the district:

Assembly constituencies 
There are eight assembly constituencies in Ranga Reddy district. They are Chevella, Rajendranagar, L. B. Nagar, Shadnagar,  Serlingampally, Ibrahimpatnam and Maheshwaram, Kalwakurthy.

See also 
List of districts in Telangana

References 

 
1978 establishments in Andhra Pradesh
Districts of Telangana